Hunsingore is a village and civil parish in the Harrogate district of North Yorkshire, England.

History 
Hunsingore translates as  "ofer or ridge of Hunsinge’s people". In the Domesday Book, the village is listed as Hulsingovre. The Goodricke family owned lots of land in the area and they lived in New House in Hunsingore rather than Ribston Hall. New House was believed to have been destroyed by Cromwell after the Battle of Marston Moor in 1644.

Originally Hunsingore was in the Claro Wapentake of the West Riding of Yorkshire. Since the county boundary shake up of 1974, it has been in North Yorkshire.

There used to be a water-powered corn mill on the River Nidd by the weir. The weir is still on the river, but the mill has been converted into housing.

There used to be a primary school in the village, but it was closed down due to low numbers. Children from Cowthorpe used to come across from the south bank of the Nidd via a footbridge to attend school here.

There is a church in the village, St John the Baptist. The church is now in the Lower Nidderdale Parish.

Transport 
The bus service through the village runs twice daily and is a Demand Responsive Service (IE must be booked in advance) to Wetherby.

The village is bounded to the west by the A1(M), but access must be gained by going on the A168 to the next junction in either direction. The A59 passes just north of Cattal and gives access to York and Harrogate.

People associated with Hunsingore
 John Goodricke (astronomer) – buried here
Kathleen Gough (anthropologist) – born here

References

External links

Villages in North Yorkshire
Civil parishes in North Yorkshire